Luis Aldair Arroyo Cabeza (born 9 April 1996) is an Ecuadorian footballer who plays as a forward for FC Vysočina Jihlava.

Career statistics

Club

Notes

References

1996 births
Living people
Ecuadorian footballers
Ecuadorian expatriate footballers
Association football forwards
Czech National Football League players
FK Fotbal Třinec players
Ecuadorian expatriate sportspeople in the Czech Republic
Expatriate footballers in the Czech Republic
FC Vysočina Jihlava players